Jake Choi (born January 14, 1985) is an American actor. He is best known for his role as Miggy on the ABC comedy Single Parents. He previously starred in Front Cover, an LGBTQ independent film. Choi has also appeared in Younger, EastSiders, and The Sun Is Also A Star.

Early life and education 
Choi was born January 14, 1985, and raised in Elmhurst, Queens, New York. He is Korean American. He was raised by his single mother, and came from "working-class immigrant roots." During high school he played in the AAU. He graduated from Newtown High School in 2004, where he played on the school varsity basketball team.

After graduating, he moved to South Korea to play basketball at Yonsei University, and subsequently played in the Korean Basketball League. He returned to the States and pursued acting, taking classes at Lee Strasberg Institute.

Career 
In 2015, Choi played his first lead role as Ryan in the independent film Front Cover, an LGBTQ romantic comedy that featured two Asian male leads. Choi's performance received positive critical reviews. According to Sheri Linden at The Hollywood Reporter: "Chen’s career-driven Ning defies easy labels, but ultimately the movie is about Ryan’s transformation, one that Choi deftly conveys."

Choi has appeared in guest roles on several television shows since 2015, including Broad City, Younger, and Hawaii 5-0. He played a recurring role on HBO's Succession in 2018.

Choi gained wider prominence after he was cast as a series regular on the fall 2018 ABC show Single Parents in the role of Miggy, a 20-year-old single dad. The show was cancelled in May 2020 after two seasons.

As of January 2019, he has a recurring role on EastSiders, a Netflix dark comedy. The same year, he played Charles Bae, brother of Charles Melton's Daniel Bae, in the film adaptation of the YA novel The Sun Is Also a Star.

Personal life 
In 2018, Choi came out as sexually fluid.

Filmography

Film

Television

References

External links 

Jake Choi on Instagram

1992 births
Living people
American LGBT entertainers
American LGBT people of Asian descent
LGBT male actors
21st-century American male actors
American male film actors
American male television actors
Male actors from New York City
American male actors of Korean descent
Yonsei University alumni
People from Elmhurst, Queens
Korean Basketball League players
Entertainers from New York City